Note: This page uses common physics notation for spherical coordinates, in which  is the angle between the z axis and the radius vector connecting the origin to the point in question, while  is the angle between the projection of the radius vector onto the x-y plane and the x axis. Several other definitions are in use, and so care must be taken in comparing different sources.

Cylindrical coordinate system

Vector fields 

Vectors are defined in cylindrical coordinates by (ρ, φ, z), where
 ρ is the length of the vector projected onto the xy-plane,
 φ is the angle between the projection of the vector onto the xy-plane (i.e. ρ) and the positive x-axis (0 ≤ φ < 2π),
 z is the regular z-coordinate.

(ρ, φ, z) is given in Cartesian coordinates by:

or inversely by:

Any vector field can be written in terms of the unit vectors as:

The cylindrical unit vectors are related to the Cartesian unit vectors by:

Note: the matrix is an orthogonal matrix, that is, its inverse is simply its transpose.

Time derivative of a vector field 

To find out how the vector field A changes in time, the time derivatives should be calculated.
For this purpose Newton's notation will be used for the time derivative.
In Cartesian coordinates this is simply:

However, in cylindrical coordinates this becomes:

The time derivatives of the unit vectors are needed. 
They are given by:

So the time derivative simplifies to:

Second time derivative of a vector field 

The second time derivative is of interest in physics, as it is found in equations of motion for classical mechanical systems.
The second time derivative of a vector field in cylindrical coordinates is given by:

To understand this expression, A is substituted for P, where P is the vector (ρ, φ, z).

This means that .

After substituting, the result is given:

In mechanics, the terms of this expression are called:

Spherical coordinate system

Vector fields 

Vectors are defined in spherical coordinates by (r, θ, φ), where
 r is the length of the vector,
 θ is the angle between the positive Z-axis and the vector in question (0 ≤ θ ≤ π), and
 φ is the angle between the projection of the vector onto the xy-plane and the positive X-axis (0 ≤ φ < 2π).

(r, θ, φ) is given in Cartesian coordinates by:

or inversely by:

Any vector field can be written in terms of the unit vectors as:

The spherical unit vectors are related to the Cartesian unit vectors by:

Note: the matrix is an orthogonal matrix, that is, its inverse is simply its transpose.

The Cartesian unit vectors are thus related to the spherical unit vectors by:

Time derivative of a vector field 

To find out how the vector field A changes in time, the time derivatives should be calculated.
In Cartesian coordinates this is simply:

However, in spherical coordinates this becomes:

The time derivatives of the unit vectors are needed.  They are given by:

Thus the time derivative becomes:

See also 
 Del in cylindrical and spherical coordinates for the specification of gradient, divergence, curl, and Laplacian in various coordinate systems.

References

Vector calculus
Coordinate systems